The Reconquista ("reconquest") is a term to describe an irredentist vision by different individuals, groups, and/or nations that the Southwestern United States should be politically or culturally returned to Mexico. Such opinions are often formed on the basis that those territories were claimed by Spain for centuries and then by Mexico from 1821 until they were ceded to the United States during the Texas Annexation (1845) and the Mexican Cession (1848) because of the Mexican–American War.

Background
The term Reconquista means "reconquest" and is an analogy to the Christian Reconquista of Moorish Iberia. The areas of greatest Mexican immigration and cultural diffusion are the same as with the territories that were taken by the United States from Mexico during the 19th century.

Cultural views

Mexican writers
In a 2001 article on the Latin American web portal Terra, "Advancement of the Spanish language and Hispanics is like a Reconquista (Reconquest)," Elena Poniatowska stated:

In his keynote address at the Second International Congress of the Spanish Language in Valladolid, Spain, in 2003, "Unity and Diversity of Spanish, Language of Encounters," Carlos Fuentes said:

In another part of his speech, Fuentes briefly returned to his idea of "reconquista:"

Poniatowska and Fuentes have concepts of reconquista can thus be viewed as a metaphor for the linguistic tendencies by a diverse group of peoples that shares a common and historical connection to the Spanish language within the Americas over the course of 500 years, which incidentally includes the border region of the Southwest United States.

Nationalist Front of Mexico

The fringe group Nationalist Front of Mexico opposes what it sees as Anglo-American cultural influences and rejects the Treaty of Guadalupe Hidalgo, as well as what its members consider the "American occupation" of territory formerly belonging to Mexico and now form the southwestern United States.

On its website, the front states:

We reject the occupation of our nation in its northern territories, an important cause of poverty and emigration. We demand that our claim to all the territories occupied by force by the United States be recognized in our Constitution, and we will bravely defend, according to the principle of self-determination to all peoples, the right of the Mexican people to live in the whole of our territory within its historical borders, as they existed and were recognized at the moment of our independence.

Charles Truxillo
A prominent advocate of Reconquista was the Chicano activist and adjunct professor Charles Truxillo (1953–2015) of the University of New Mexico (UNM). He envisioned a sovereign Hispanic nation, the República del Norte (Republic of the North), which would encompass Northern Mexico, Baja California, California, Arizona, New Mexico, and Texas. He supported the secession of US Southwest to form an independent Chicano nation and argued that the Articles of Confederation gave individual states full sovereignty, including the legal right to secede.
   
Truxillo, who taught at UNM's Chicano Studies Program on a yearly contract, suggested in an interview, "Native-born American Hispanics feel like strangers in their own land." He said, "We remain subordinated. We have a negative image of our own culture, created by the media. Self-loathing is a terrible form of oppression. The long history of oppression and subordination has to end" and that on both sides of the US–Mexico border "there is a growing fusion, a reviving of connections.... Southwest Chicanos and Norteno Mexicanos are becoming one people again." Truxillo stated that Hispanics who achieved positions of power or otherwise were "enjoying the benefits of assimilation" are most likely to oppose a new nation and explained:

Truxillo believed that the República del Norte would be brought into existence by "any means necessary" but that it would be formed by probably not civil war but the electoral pressure of the region's future majority Hispanic population. Truxillo added that he believed it was his duty to help develop a "cadre of intellectuals" to think about how the new state could become a reality.
     
In 2007, the UNM reportedly decided to stop renewing Truxillo's yearly contract. Truxillo claimed that his "firing" was because of his radical beliefs and argued, "Tenure is based on a vote from my colleagues. Few are in favor of a Chicano professor advocating a Chicano nation state."

José Ángel Gutiérrez
In an interview with In Search of Aztlán on 8 August 1999, José Ángel Gutiérrez, a political science professor at the University of Texas at Arlington, stated: 

In an interview with the Star-Telegram in October 2000, Gutiérrez stated that many recent Mexican immigrants "want to recreate all of Mexico and join all of Mexico into one.  And they are going to do that, even if it's just demographically.... They are going to have political sovereignty over the Southwest and many parts of the Midwest." In a videotape made by the Immigration Watchdog website, as cited in The Washington Times, Gutiérrez was quoted as saying, "We are millions. We just have to survive. We have an aging white America. They are not making babies. They are dying. It's a matter of time. The explosion is in our population." In a subsequent interview with The Washington Times in 2006, Gutiérrez backtracked and said that there was "no viable" Reconquista movement, and he blamed interest in the issue on closed-border groups and "right-wing blogs."

Other views
Felipe Gonzáles, a professor at the University of New Mexico (UNM), who is director of UNM's Southwest Hispanic Research Institute, has stated that there was a "certain homeland undercurrent" among New Mexico Hispanics, but the "educated elites are going to have to pick up on this idea [of a new nation] and run with it and use it as a point of confrontation if it is to succeed." Juan José Peña of the Hispano Round Table of New Mexico believed that Mexicans and Mexican Americans lack the political consciousness to form a separate nation: "Right now, there's no movement capable of undertaking it."

Illegal immigration to the Southwest is sometimes viewed as a form of Reconquista in light of the fact that Texas statehood was preceded by an influx of US settlers into that Mexican province until US citizens outnumbered Mexicans ten–to-one and took over the area's governance. The theory is that the reverse will happen when Mexicans eventually become so numerous in the region that they wield substantial influence, including political power. Even if it is not intended, some analysts say the significant demographic shift in the Southwest may result in "a de facto reconquista."

A May 2006 Zogby poll reported that 58% of Mexicans believed that the Southwest belongs to Mexico.

The American political scientist Samuel P. Huntington, a proponent of the widespread popularity of Reconquista, stated in 2004:

The neoliberal political writer Mickey Kaus remarked:

Other Hispanic rights leaders say that Reconquista is nothing more than a fringe movement. Nativo Lopez, president of the Mexican American Political Association in Los Angeles, when asked about the concept of Reconquista by a reporter, responded, "I can't believe you're bothering me with questions about this. You're not serious. I can't believe you're bothering with such a minuscule, fringe element that has no resonance with this populace."

Reconquista sentiments are often jocularly referred to by media  for Mexicans, including a recent Absolut Vodka ad that generated significant controversy in the United States for printing of a map of prewar Mexico. Reconquista is a recurring theme in contemporary fiction and nonfiction, particularly among far-right authors.

The National Council of La Raza, the largest national Hispanic civil rights and advocacy organization in the United States, stated on its website that it "has never supported and does not endorse the notion of a Reconquista (the right of Mexico to reclaim land in the southwestern United States) or Aztlán."

Real approaches

Early 20th century
In 1915, the capture of Basilio Ramos, an alleged supporter of the Mexican dictator Victoriano Huerta, in Brownsville, Texas, revealed the existence of the Plan of San Diego, whose goal is often interpreted to be reconquering the Southwestern United States to gain domestic support in Mexico for Huerta. However, other theories are that the plan, which included killing all white males at least 16 years old, had been created to push the US, eventually successfully, to support the rule of Venustiano Carranza, a major leader of the Mexican Revolution. Most evidence supports that the Plan of San Diego was by anarchists and intended for independence of only South Texas, not all of the Southwestern United States, for an anarchist political system.

In 1917, according to the intercepted Zimmermann Telegram, Germany, in exchange for Mexico joining it as an ally against the United States during World War I, was ready to assist Mexico to "reconquer" its lost territories of Texas, New Mexico, and Arizona. There is no evidence that the Mexican government ever seriously considered it, which would almost certainly have failed if attempted. The telegram's disclosure promoted anti-Mexican sentiment and was a major factor in the US declaring war on Germany.

Modern
For Chicanos in the 1960s, the term was not used, but they understood that "Aztlán" should undergo cultural revival and expansion.

In the late 1990s to the early 2000s, as US census data showed that the population of Mexican Americans in the Southwestern United States had increased, and the term was popularized by contemporary intellectuals in Mexico, such as Carlos Fuentes, Elena Poniatowska, and President Vicente Fox, who spoke of Mexican immigrants maintaining their culture and Spanish language in the United States as they migrated in greater numbers to the area.

In March 2015, at the midst of the War in Ukraine, when the US was planning on supporting Ukraine to fight against Russia, Dukuvakha Abdurakhmanov, the speaker of the Chechen Parliament, threatened to arm Mexico against the United States and questioned the legal status of the territories of California, New Mexico, Arizona, Nevada, Utah, Colorado, and Wyoming.

See also

Chicano nationalism
Guayana Esequiba
Irredentism
Manifest Destiny
MEChA
Mexica Movement
Nativism (politics)
Plan Espiritual de Aztlán
Revanchism
Sore Loser (disambiguation)

References

Mexico–United States relations
Southwestern United States
History of the Southwestern United States
Mexican irredentism
Demographics of the United States
Immigration to the United States
American culture
Chicano nationalism
Mexican nationalism